This is a list of Telugu-language films produced in the year 1972.

References

Telugu
1972
1972 in Indian cinema